The 17th American Society of Cinematographers Awards were held on February 16, 2003, honoring the best cinematographers of film and television in 2002.

Winners
 Outstanding Achievement in Cinematography in Theatrical Releases
 Road to Perdition – Conrad L. Hall (posthumously)
 Outstanding Achievement in Cinematography in Movies of the Week/Mini-Series/Pilot for Network or Basic Broadcast TV
 CSI: Miami (Episode: "Cross Jurisdiction") – Michael Barrett
 Outstanding Achievement in Cinematography in Episodic TV Series
 MDs (Episode: "Wing and a Prayer") – Robert Primes
 Outstanding Achievement in Cinematography in Movies of the Week/Mini-Series/Pilot for Basic or Pay TV
 Last Call – Jeff Jur
 Special Achievement Award
 Roger Ebert
 Lifetime Achievement Award
 Bill Butler
 Board of the Governors Award
 Norman Jewison
 International Award
 Witold Sobociński
 President's Award
 Ralph Woolsey

References

2002
2002 film awards
2002 television awards
2002 in American cinema
2002 in American television
2002 guild awards
2002 awards in the United States
February 2003 events in the United States